You Are Going to Prison is a non-fiction book by  Jim Hogshire. As its title implies, it is a practical guide for those who are facing their first experience with incarceration. In 2006, it was loosely adapted into the film Let's Go to Prison.

Publication

Loompanics Unlimited, 1994
Breakout Productions, 1999

1994 non-fiction books
Handbooks and manuals
Non-fiction crime books
Loompanics books